Lisa Taylor Ballance is an American marine scientist who is Director Marine Mammal Institute and Endowed Chair for Marine Mammal Research at Oregon State University.

Early life and education 
Ballance studied biology as an undergraduate student at the University of California, San Diego. Ballance completed her master's studies in marine science at San Jose State University. Her research considered the ecology and behavior of the bottlenose dolphin. She moved to University of California, Los Angeles for her doctoral research, where she studied the ecology of tropical seabirds in the Eastern Pacific. During her doctorate she joined the Association for Women in Science. She was a postdoctoral researcher at the National Academies of Sciences, Engineering, and Medicine.

Research and career 

Ballance joined the National Oceanic and Atmospheric Administration (NOAA). Her research has focused on seabirds and cetaceans. She held various positions at the NOAA, including Chair of the Pacific Seabird Group, Lead of Cetacean Ecology and Chief of Stenella Abundance Research.

In 2013, Balance was appointed Chair of the NOAA Fisheries National Seabird Program. The overarching aim of the program was to mitigate bycatch (the unwanted fish caught by commercial fishing nets) and to promote seats as indicates of ecosystem health. She led the Eastern Tropical Pacific Research Program, which was responsible for the “Dolphin Safe” label found on canned tuna.

Ballance was made Professor of Fisheries and Wildlife and Director of the Marine Mammal Research Institute at Oregon State University in 2019. She led expeditions to see beaked whales and dolphins. She was awarded a $2 million grant to collect information about the distribution of marine mammals.

Selected publications

References 

Year of birth missing (living people)
Living people
San Jose State University alumni
University of California, Los Angeles alumni
Oregon State University faculty
Marine biologists
21st-century American scientists
American women scientists
21st-century American women scientists